MicroMSI for Windows is a remote sensing imagery analysis program designed for use in introductory courses in remote sensing, developed by the National Geospatial-Intelligence Agency. MicroMSI for Windows is a "public domain program and can be freely redistributed for non-commercial purposes", after modern terminology freeware.

Information

These pages have been made available to enhance the support services for the MicroMSI user community. A number of resources are provided here to help you resolve problems, report bugs, and suggest improvements to MicroMSI products and services.

MicroMSI for Windows updates the original DOS-based version with a full 32-bit Windows implementation.

Documentation is supplied in the extensive help file which serves as a reference to MicroMSI features and commands, but also provides a multi-spectral image processing tutorial as student exercises.

Features

 multiple display windows (up to 10) simultaneously
 band-ratioed, band-differenced, thermal, multiband (including derived panchromatic), NDVI, unsupervised classification, spectral classification and stereo anaglyph displays added to the gray-level, multiband (pseudo-color only) and supervised classification displays of MicroMSI for DOS
 principal component analysis
 context-sensitive help
 help exercises covering all of the major functions of the program
 full support of any Windows output device (e.g., color printers) at any size up to E-size
 an image importing/indexing "wizard" that simplifies the process of accessing your data
 MicroMSI images can be cut to the clipboard and pasted into other Window applications
 MicroMSI images can be saved as bitmaps
 grid, north arrow and symbols added as overlay options to captions (which now can be any Windows font, size and rotation)
 support for BIL (band interleaved by line files) and BSQ (band sequential in one file) added to the individual band sequential files supported by the earlier version; all formats can be 8-16 bits per pixel including swapped word order
 redesign of the data file access system to allow access to hyperspectral data up to 256 bands
 a new index file format
 provides room for future features
 old format index files can be used but updating them via the Index Wizard is recommended to add new capabilities
 the Help exercise, Update Index, leads you through the conversion process
 many, many improvements to the user-interface

References 
MicroMSI at NGA

Remote sensing software
Freeware